The Right to Information (RTI) Bill was passed on 26 March 2019 by the Parliament of Ghana. It received presidential assent on May 21, 2019, and became effective in January 2020.  
Prior to its passage, various stakeholders believed the delay in passing the bill into law was to allow exemptions of certain vital information bordering around government policies which they intend to conceal from the public (Akoto, 2012). This bill is to enable citizens to hold government accountable to ensure that there is a high level of transparency in governance of the country.

Right to information bill in other countries
The right to information is not a new on the African continent. It was first adopted by Sweden in 1766 and Finland in 1951. Over the past two decades many African countries have also adopted the laws, indicating acknowledgement that transparency is an essential condition of democracy. Currently 24% of the African countries have adopted the law. These countries include: South Africa, Angola, Zimbabwe, Uganda, Nigeria, Ethiopia, Rwanda, Liberia, Guinea and Ghana. Access to Information and Privacy Act in Zimbabwe has rather been used to protect information instead of making it available to the general public all in the name of privacy. As a result, it is not included in counts of RTI laws sometimes (Good law and practice, 2012). The Middle East has only three countries adopting the law (Jordan, Yemen and Israel) and it started in the January 2013. In Asia and the Pacific sixteen countries have adopted the access to information laws. They include: Bangladesh, India, Australia, Tajikistan, South Korea, Thailand, Cook Islands, Mongolia, Kyrgyzstan, Taiwan, Indonesia, Uzbekistan Japan, Nepal, New Zealand, and Pakistan. Fifteen countries in the Americas and six in the Caribbean had access to information laws as of September 2013.

History
The right to information Bill is implicit in the notion that the Ghanaian taxpayers need to have access to information concerning what government does with their money and what government plans to do on their behalf (Daily Graphic, July 21, 2017a). The bill is meant to ensure Ghanaians have access to governance or official information from public offices on request and without request (Boateng, 2018). The Bill is meant to put in effect, Article 21 (1) (f) of the 1992 constitution of the republic of Ghana which states that “All persons shall have the right to information subject to such qualifications and laws as are necessary in a democratic society.” (Daily Graphic, July 21, 2017b). However, many years of struggle in parliamentary debates and reviews has seen the bill not passed into law yet despite it was first drafted in 1999 and reviewed 2003 (Daily Graphic, July 21, 2017c).

References

Law of Ghana
Freedom of information legislation